Tanout is a department of the Zinder Region in Niger. Its administrative seat is the city of Tanout. As of 2011, the department had a total population of 475,125 people.

On 15 April 2010, the Council of Ministers announced that Amadou Seybou Dioffo, a retired Captain from the Niger Armed Forces, had been appointed prefect of the department.

Municipalities
Tanout Department is divided into six municipalities, listed with population as of 2011 census:
Gangara  120,585
Falanko  4,561
Ollelewa  105,167
Tanout  134,074
Tarka 89,533
Tenhia  21,205

Notes

Departments of Niger
Zinder Region